Ebenezer Wilson Poe (November 11, 1846 – June 19, 1898) was a Republican politician in the U.S. State of Ohio who was Ohio State Auditor 1888–1896.

Early life

Ebenezer W. Poe was born at Hancock County, Ohio on a farm near Findlay. After his father enlisted in the Union Army in 1862 during the American Civil War, he enlisted at age 16 in Company G of the One Hundred Thirty-Third Ohio Volunteer Infantry, and served in the Army of the Cumberland until mustered out in August, 1864.

Mid life

Poe then re-enrolled in the high school in Findlay and graduated. He taught school for three years, was a store clerk, and in 1873 ran a store. He disposed of that business in 1875, and was a traveling salesman for six years. In 1881, the Republicans nominated him for Wood County Auditor, he won, and was re-elected in 1883.

State office

At the 1887 Republican State Convention, Poe won on the first ballot in a field of seven for the nomination for Ohio State Auditor. He defeated incumbent Democrat Emil Kiesewetter in the general election. He won re-election in 1891.

At the 1895 Republican State Convention, Poe was among eight candidates for the Governor nomination, and, after the third ballot, threw his support to eventual nominee and Governor Asa S. Bushnell. After his term as Auditor expired, he associated with an Equitable Life Insurance.

Personal

Poe was married October 8, 1868 to Caroline Thomas of McComb, Ohio, and had four children.

Poe died June 19, 1898 in Columbus, Ohio. He was a member of the Independent Order of Odd Fellows and Grand Army of the Republic, and was a Methodist. He was interred in Green Lawn Cemetery, Columbus, Ohio.

Notes

References

Ohio Republicans
People from Findlay, Ohio
People from Wood County, Ohio
1846 births
State Auditors of Ohio
People of Ohio in the American Civil War
1898 deaths
Politicians from Columbus, Ohio
Burials at Green Lawn Cemetery (Columbus, Ohio)
19th-century American politicians